Collins was an unincorporated community in Napa County, California. It lies at an elevation of 49 feet (15 m). In 1992, the community was annexed and incorporated into American Canyon.

References

Unincorporated communities in California
Unincorporated communities in Napa County, California